Klaus Jungbluth Rodríguez (born 10 July 1979 in Guayaquil, Ecuador) is a cross-country skier from Ecuador.

Skiing career
In 2016 Jungbluth sought and received the help of the Ecuadorian National Olympic Committee to create a ski federation for Ecuador, which allowed him to compete for the country. Jungbluth lives and trains in Mountain Creek, Queensland, Australia. Jungbluth will become the first athlete from Ecuador to compete at the Winter Olympics. On 19 January 2018 Jungbluth was named as the country's flag bearer during the opening ceremony.

He was awarded the prize Espìritu Olìmpico 2018 by the Ecuadorian National Olympic Committee.

Personal life
Jungbluth is completing his PhD in Exercise Physiology at the University of Queensland in Australia.
He has previously completed a bachelor's degree in physiotherapy (2009) at Charles University of Prague, Czech Republic and a master's degree in Exercise Physiology (2011) at the Norwegian University of Science and Technology (NTNU) in Trondheim, Norway.
Speaks six languages: Spanish, English, Italian, Czech, Norwegian and German.
He currently resides in the Sunshine Coast, Queensland, Australia with his wife Erika and youngest children, Kikkan, Elisa and Kurt, while his two older daughters Kiersten and Melina live in Guayaquil.

Jungbluth was the lone representative for the nation of Ecuador in the 2018 Winter Olympics in South Korea.

See also
Ecuador at the 2018 Winter Olympics

References

1979 births
Ecuadorian male cross-country skiers
Living people
Sportspeople from Guayaquil
Ecuadorian expatriates in Australia
Cross-country skiers at the 2018 Winter Olympics
Olympic cross-country skiers of Ecuador
Charles University alumni